Eugenol synthase (LtCES1, EGS1, EGS2) is an enzyme with systematic name eugenol:NADP+ oxidoreductase (coniferyl ester reducing). This enzyme catalyses the following chemical reaction: eugenol + a carboxylate + NADP+  a coniferyl ester + NADPH + H+

The enzyme acts in the reverse direction.

References

External links 
 

EC 1.1.1